Kanniammanpettai, is an industrial/residential area in Manali, North of Chennai, a metropolitan city in Tamil Nadu, India. In October 2011, the erstwhile Kadapakkam village panchayat is merged with Greater Chennai Corporation and it came under the jurisdiction of Greater Chennai Corporation. Though Kanniammanpettai is annexed with Greater Chennai Corporation it is remained as a part of Tiruvottiyur taluk in Tiruvallur district till 15 August 2018.

Location
Kanniammanpettai is located in Manali, North Chennai with  Tiruvottiyur in the east and south. Other neighbouring areas include Mathur, Madhavaram, Andarkuppam, Manali Pudhunagar, Kosappur, Ennore.

Surroundings

References

External links
Corporation of Chennai
CMDA Official Webpage
CDMA map of Mathur

Neighbourhoods in Chennai